Sun Weidong (born September 1966) is a Chinese diplomat who serves as vice-minister of Foreign Affairs since 15 November 2022. He previously served as Chinese Ambassador to Pakistan (2013-2017) and India (2019-2022).

Biography
Sun Weidong was born in Xuzhou, Jiangsu, in September 1966. From 1989 to 1996 he taught at China Foreign Affairs University. He joined the Foreign Service in 1996 and has served primarily in Southeast Asia. From 2005 to 2008 he was counsellor of Chinese Embassy in India.  After returning to China he was appointed deputy director of Asia Department of the Ministry of Foreign Affairs. He served as the Chinese Ambassador to Pakistan from 2013 through 2017. Then he was director of the Department of Policy Planning of the Ministry of Foreign Affairs. In 2019, 13th Standing Committee of the National People's Congress appointed him Chinese Ambassador to India, replacing Luo Zhaohui. He served this position till October 2022. On 15 November 2022, he was appointed vice-minister of Foreign Affairs.

Sun is married to Bao Jiqing (包吉氢), who worked as a teaching assistant and lecturer at the English Department of China Foreign Affairs University from 1991 to 2001. The couple have a daughter.

Foreign honors
Hilal-e-Pakistan (Pakistan, October 2017)

References

1966 births
Living people
People from Xuzhou
Ambassadors of China to Pakistan
Ambassadors of China to India
Recipients of Hilal-i-Pakistan